The Mark Twain Hotel is a historic residential hotel located at 111 W. Division Street in the Near North Side community area of Chicago, Illinois. Built in 1930 by developer Fred Becklenberg, the hotel was one of several residential hotels built to house the influx of labor to Chicago in the late 1920s. Most of the hotel's residents were permanent; according to 1940 census records, the majority had been at the hotel for over five years. Architect Harry Glube designed the hotel in the Art Deco style, a departure from the revival styles normally used for residential hotels. The brick building features extensive terra cotta detailing, including an elaborate cornice and stringcourse above and below the fourth floor.

The building was added to the National Register of Historic Places on May 8, 2017.

The building was renovated starting in 2018 and celebrated a grand re-opening in 2020. During the renovation it was converted to 148 typical but affordable rental studio apartments by NHP Foundation.

External links
- The Mark Twain (official website for rental apartments)

References

Hotel buildings on the National Register of Historic Places in Chicago
Hotel buildings completed in 1930
Art Deco architecture in Illinois